The Skye Terrier is a Scottish dog breed that is a long, low, hardy terrier and "one of the most endangered native dog breeds in the United Kingdom" according to The Kennel Club.

Appearance

Coat
The Skye is double coated with a short, soft undercoat and a hard, straight topcoat. The shorter hair of the head veils the forehead and eyes, forming a moderate beard. The ears are generally well feathered and, in prick-eared examples, the hair normally falls like a fringe, accenting the form, and blending with the side locks.

Colour
Fawn, blue, dark or light grey, blonde, and black with black points (ears and muzzle) all occur. They may have any self colour, allowing for some shading of same colour on the body and a lighter undercoat, so long as the nose and ears are black. There is generally no further patterning on the body, but a small white spot on the chest is relatively common.

Types

Except for the shape and size of the ears, there is no significant difference nor preference given between the prick- and drop-eared types. When prick, they are medium-sized, carried high on the skull and angled slightly outwards.

Upkeep

The Skye Terrier is a hunting dog and enjoys a daily outing, exploring in a safe area. It also needs a short to moderate walk with its owner to stay in shape. The Skye enjoys life as a housedog, and prefers not to live outdoors. So, owners should not keep them outdoors as their natural habitats. Regular combing (about twice a week) is all that is needed to keep the Skye looking well and detangled. Many owners think that an occasional bath will soften the coat, as is often the case with other terriers, but that is not the case. An occasional bath will not soften the coat too much. Owners must pay attention to the area around their eyes and mouth; this may need frequent cleaning.

Health

If a Skye is exercised too often, too young, especially before 8 months, they can damage their bone growth, leading to a painful limp and possibly badly bowed legs. Jumping up and down from objects, climbing over objects, running, even long walks, are all things to be avoided for the first 8 to 10 months to prevent later problems and allow for correct closure of the growth plate.(This is highly contested within the scientific field. Proper exercise does not cause defects.)

Degenerative disc disease is also a common problem in short-legged dogs; as many as 10% of Skyes will suffer from it.

Mammary cancer is the leading cause of Skye Terrier deaths, with hemangiosarcomas (a malignant tumour of the blood vessels), autoimmune disease, and hyperthyroidism as other concerns of the breed.

History

These dogs were found on the Isle of Skye, and the dogs were then named Skye Terriers. Some confusion exists in tracing its history because, for a certain time, several different breeds had the same name "Skye Terrier". The loyal dog, said to have been present under the petticoat of Mary, Queen of Scots at her execution, has been ascribed as a Skye Terrier. In 1840, Queen Victoria made the breed fancy, keeping both drop-(floppy) and prick-(upwards) eared dogs. A colour lithograph of Skye Terriers was included in "The Illustrated Book of the Dog" by Vero Shaw in 1881.

This greatly increased its popularity and the Skye Terrier came to America due to this. The AKC recognized the breed in 1887, and it quickly appeared on the show scene. Its popularity has significantly dropped and now it is one of the least known terriers. There is little awareness of its former popularity.

Under threat 
There are concerns that the breed is under threat of extinction with only 30 born in the UK in 2005. It is today the most endangered of the Vulnerable Native Breeds of that country, and within 40 years the breed may disappear completely.

See also
 List of dog breeds

References

FCI breeds
Dog breeds originating in Scotland
Terriers
Rare dog breeds
Vulnerable Native Breeds
Isle of Skye